This is a list of men's national basketball team players who represented Croatia at the EuroBasket, the FIBA Basketball World Cup, and the Summer Olympics. 

Since 1992, the Croatia has participated at fourteen EuroBasket tournaments (1993, 1995, 1997, 1999, 2001, 2003, 2005, 2007, 2009, 2011, 2013, 2015, 2017, 2022), three Basketball World Cups (1994, 2010, 2014) and four Olympic tournaments (Barcelona 1992, Atlanta 1996, Beijing 2008, Rio de Janeiro 2016).

Point guard Roko Ukić holds the records of ten tournaments played in total. 

This list does not include players who played only at the qualification tournaments for named competitions, the Mediterranean Games or other minor tournaments.

Key

Players 
Note: This list is correct through the end of the EuroBasket 2022.

References

Croatia men's national basketball team
Lists of basketball players